The 2013 Mid-American Conference men's soccer season will be the 21st season of men's varsity soccer in the conference.

The defending regular season and tournament champions are the Akron Zips.

Changes from 2012 

Florida Atlantic left when it was confirmed as a full member of Conference USA, which sponsors men's soccer, effective with the 2013–14 school year.

Season outlook

Teams

Stadia and locations

MAC Tournament 

The format for the 2013 MAC Men's Soccer Tournament will be announced in the Fall of 2013.

Results

Statistics

References 

 
2013 NCAA Division I men's soccer season